Fragile is the seventh leader album by the Japanese pianist Junko Onishi, released on September 23, 1998, in Japan. It was re-released on May 4, 1999, by Blue Note Records.

Track listing

Personnel
Junko Onishi - piano
Reginald Veal - double bass
Karriem "Ol Skool Jamz" Riggins - drums
Motohiko Hino - drums (2, 4)
Tamaya Honda - drums (5, 7)
PEACE - Vocal (4)

Production
Executive producer - Hitoshi Namekata
Co-producer - Junko Onishi
Recording and mixing engineer - Jim Anderson
Assistant engineer - Masataka Saito, Masaaki Ugazin, Tomoyuki Fukuda
Mastering engineer - Yoshio Okazaki
Cover photograph - Kunihiro Takuma
Inner photograph - Hitsuru Hirota
Art director - Kaoru Taku
A&R - Yoshiko Tsuge

References

External links
Junko Onishi HP

Junko Onishi Fragile By Bill Bennett

1998 albums
Junko Onishi albums